Colegio La Salle Buenos Aires is an Argentine private school founded in 1891 by French Brother Jumaélien and located in Balvanera, Buenos Aires.

It belongs to the Institute of the Brothers of the Christian Schools, a Roman Catholic religious teaching congregation created by French priest and educational reformer Jean-Baptiste de La Salle in 1680.

Originally established as a boys-only school, nowadays both male and female students attend classes. It offers early childhood, primary, secondary and tertiary education.

References

External links
Official website

Schools in Argentina
Lasallian schools in Argentina
1891 establishments in Argentina
Educational institutions established in 1891